El Cocla is a corregimiento in Calobre District, Veraguas Province, Panama with a population of 608 as of 2010. Its population as of 1990 was 608; its population as of 2000 was 597.

References

Corregimientos of Veraguas Province